Henry Felton was a churchman and academic.

Henry Felton may also refer to:
Sir Henry Felton, 2nd Baronet (1619–1690)
Sir Henry Felton, 1st Baronet (died 1624), of the Felton baronets

See also
Felton (disambiguation)